Hartley Castle was a castle near Kirkby Stephen, Cumbria, England.

History
The manor was confiscated circa 1315 from Roger de Clifford and granted to Andrew de Harcla (anglicized to Andrew de Harclay or Hartley). The name Harcla is thought to be from the Old English for "hard ground" and may refer to the outcrop of land that the castle is built upon in the Eden valley.

The existing manor house was fortified by de Harcla, some time prior to 1323, when he was ordered by King Edward II to be hanged, drawn and quartered for alleged collusion with Robert the Bruce, and forfeited his earldom and lands. It was granted to Ralph de Neville who later sold it through three other hands to Thomas de Musgrave who on 4 October 1353 was granted a licence to crenellate by King Edward III:
mansum manerii ... Harcla quod prope Marchiam Scociae situatur et per Scotos inimicos nostros saepius ante haec tempora combustum extitit et destructum
which roughly speaking says fortification was needed because
Harcla is situated near the Scottish Marches and because our enemy the Scots have often burned and destroyed it.

It was improved during the 17th century with the addition in 1615 of a pair of wings but was abandoned circa 1677. Thomas Machel visited the castle in 1677 and described it as

An Elizabethan building consisting of an inner quadrangle surrounded by buildings, and an outer court to the north protected by a thick and high curtain wall. The entrance to it was approached through a gateway at the head of a flight of steps from the road. Directly opposite an archway opened into the inner court; on the left, or east side, was the kitchen and buttery, with the hall beyond, entered by an external stair from the court; the south end was occupied by the chapel and withdrawing rooms; whilst on the western side there was a long gallery lighted by a large oriel window facing the quadrangle

Another sketch from 1692 shows a thick, high curtain wall enclosing a square outer court, with an inner court enclosed by three and four storey buildings. The  at right shows what remained by the beginning of the 18th century. It was demolished between 1704 and 1744 for building stone which was used to repair Edenhall. 

The castle layout appears to have been similar to Sudeley Castle in the Cotswolds, with its double courtyards separated by a low dividing wall and a central small door and its oriel-windowed hall, but without Sudeley's later Southern Wing and with a curtain wall demarking the second courtyard instead.

Today

Apart from limited earthworks, all that remains now is a few metres of wall and stairs down to a vaulted cellar for the former kitchen. The site currently houses a late-18th-century farmhouse and outbuildings.

See also

Listed buildings in Hartley, Cumbria
Castles in Great Britain and Ireland
List of castles in England
Sudeley Castle

References

External links 
 English Heritage's entry for Hartley Castle
 The castle site's area as it appears from the air
 An aerial photo of the castle's site and Hartley village
 A photo of the remains of the castle (requires registration)

Castles in Cumbria
Grade II listed buildings in Cumbria
Eden District